Juan Polainas is a 1960 Mexican comedy film directed by René Cardona.

Cast 
 Irma Dorantes
 Antonio Espino
 Daniel 'Chino' Herrera
 Omar Jasso
 Paco Michel
 Francisco Reiguera
 Andrés Soler
 José Torvay

References

Bibliography 
 García Riera, Emilio. Historia documental del cine mexicano: 1959-1960. Universidad de Guadalajara, 1994.

External links 
 

1960 films
1960 comedy films
Mexican comedy films
1960s Spanish-language films
Films directed by René Cardona
1960s Mexican films